Sodrásban is a 1964 Hungarian drama film directed by István Gaál. The film was chosen to be part of the Budapest Twelve, a list of Hungarian films considered the best in 1968.

Cast 
 Andrea Drahota – Vadóc
 Marianna Moór – Böbe 
 Istvánné Zsipi – Anna néni
 Sándor Csikós – Laci 
 János Harkányi – Gabi
 András Kozák – Luja

References

External links 

1964 drama films
1964 films
Hungarian drama films